Hanleya is a genus of polyplacophoran molluscs known from  Oligocene and Miocene fossils; it is represented today by a number of species including H. sinica Xu 1990 (China), H. brachyplax (Brazil) and H. hanleyi Bean in Thorpe, 1844 (Chile), which feeds on sponges.

References 

Prehistoric chiton genera
Chiton genera
Oligocene genus first appearances
Miocene genus extinctions